Yedikapı is a village in the Şirvan District of Siirt Province in Turkey. The village had a population of 49 in 2021.

The hamlets of Başçavuş and İmren are attached to Yolbaşı.

References 

Kurdish settlements in Siirt Province
Villages in Şirvan District